Daniel Mark Hodgson (born 26 February 1990) is an English first-class cricketer.  A wicket-keeper and right-handed batsman, Hodgson played for Yorkshire County Cricket Club.

Hodgson played for the Yorkshire Second XI in the Second XI Championship, as well as appearing in his debut List A match for Yorkshire against the Unicorns in August 2012.  He took one catch in the game, but was not required to bat. He has since appeared in thirteen more List A matches.

He has had two previous first-class outings representing Leeds/Bradford MCC Universities. Hodgson made a number of appearances for the Mountaineers side in Zimbabwe in 2012 and 2013.

Hodgson spent a short time on loan at Derbyshire in 2014 and was released by Yorkshire in August 2015.

References

1990 births
Living people
English cricketers
Yorkshire cricketers
People from Northallerton
Derbyshire cricketers
Cricketers from Yorkshire
Leeds/Bradford MCCU cricketers
Mountaineers cricketers
Northumberland cricketers
Wicket-keepers